Tubuca is a genus in Ocypodidae, a family of fiddler and ghost crabs. There are more than 20 described species in Tubuca.

Species
These 23 species belong to the genus Tubuca:

 Tubuca acuta (Stimpson, 1858)
 Tubuca alcocki Shih, Chan & Ng, 2018
 Tubuca arcuata (De Haan, 1835)
 Tubuca australiae (Crane, 1975)
 Tubuca bellator (White, 1847)
 Tubuca capricornis (Crane, 1975)
 Tubuca coarctata (H.Milne Edwards, 1852)
 Tubuca demani (Ortmann, 1897)
 Tubuca dussumieri (H.Milne Edwards, 1852)
 Tubuca elegans (George & Jones, 1982)
 Tubuca flammula (Crane, 1975)
 Tubuca forcipata (Adams & White, 1849)
 Tubuca hirsutimanus (George & Jones, 1982)
 Tubuca longidigitum (Kingsley, 1880)
 Tubuca paradussumieri (Bott, 1973)
 Tubuca polita (Crane, 1975)
 Tubuca rhizophorae (Tweedie, 1950)
 Tubuca rhizophoriae
 Tubuca rosea (Tweedie, 1937)
 Tubuca seismella (Crane, 1975)
 Tubuca signata (Hess, 1865)
 Tubuca typhoni (Crane, 1975)
 Tubuca urvillei (H.Milne Edwards, 1852)

References

Further reading

 

Ocypodoidea